Campbellana is a genus of moths of the Carposinidae family, containing only one species, Campbellana attenuata. This species is endemic to the Campbell Islands of New Zealand.

Taxonomy 

C. attenuata was described by J. T. Salmon and J. D. Bradley in 1956 using material collected by J. H. Sorensen at Campbell Island in August. The holotype is held at the Museum of New Zealand Te Papa Tongarewa.

Description 
C. attenuata is described by Salmon and Bradley as follows:

Distribution 
This species is endemic to New Zealand. It is only found at Campbell Island.

Habitat 
C. attenuata prefers tussock habitat.

Behaviour 
This species jumps similar to a grasshopper.

References

External links

Image of holotype specimen

Copromorphoidea
Monotypic moth genera
Moths of New Zealand
Endemic fauna of New Zealand
Fauna of the Campbell Islands
Endemic moths of New Zealand